Sumbe is a locality of Cameroon located in the South West Region and the department of Manyu. It is administratively attached to the district of Upper Bayang (Tinto Council) and the township of Tinto.

People 
In 1953, the village was still attached to Fotabe. In 1967, it had 847 inhabitants, Banyangi. At that time, it had a market every Saturday, a public school founded in 1947, a cooperative (CPMS), and a rural center for young people.

Education 
Sumbe has a public college.

References

External links 

https://www.pndp.org/documents/22_CDP_TINTO1.pdf|title=Communal Development Plan for Tinto Council], PNDP, s. d., 171 p.

Dictionary of the villages of the Manyu, ORSTOM Center of Yaoundé, 1973,  {{read online|link=http://horizon.documentation.ird.fr/exl-doc /pleins_textes/divers08-01/02887.pdf

http://cvuc.cm/national/index.php/fr/carte-communale/region-du-sud-ouest/145-association/carte-administrative/sud-ouest/manyu/580 -tinto Tinto], on the website Communes and united cities of Cameroon (CVUC)

http://www.upperbayang.org/#!upper-bayang-sub-divisions/c1xhs Upper Bayang Sub-division

Villages